Belenli is a village in the Kâhta District, Adıyaman Province, Turkey. The village is populated by Kurds of the Bezikan tribe and had a population of 351 in 2021.

The three hamlets of Güçlü, Oğlak and Yüksekyayla are attached to Belenli.

References

Villages in Kâhta District
Kurdish settlements in Adıyaman Province